Pablo Andrés Pereira Errandonea (born April 24, 1985 in Montevideo, Uruguay) is a Uruguayan football defender currently playing for Central Español.

Teams
  Defensor Sporting 2000-2001
  Liverpool 2001-2007
  Arturo Fernández Vial 2008
  Rampla Juniors 2008-2009
  Fénix 2009-2010
  Ferro Carril Oeste 2010-2011
  Liverpool 2011-2012
  Correcaminos UAT 2012-2013
  Central Español 2013–present

References
 Profile at BDFA 
 Profile at Tenfield Digital 

1985 births
Living people
Uruguayan footballers
Uruguayan expatriate footballers
Liverpool F.C. (Montevideo) players
Defensor Sporting players
Centro Atlético Fénix players
Rampla Juniors players
Ferro Carril Oeste footballers
C.D. Arturo Fernández Vial footballers
Correcaminos UAT footballers
Central Español players
Primera B de Chile players
Expatriate footballers in Chile
Expatriate footballers in Mexico
Expatriate footballers in Argentina

Association football defenders